Chidera Ejuke (born 2 January 1998) is a Nigerian professional footballer who plays as a left winger for Bundesliga club Hertha BSC, on loan from CSKA Moscow. He also plays for the Nigeria national team.

Career
In March 2017, Ejuke signed a three-year contract with Eliteserien side Vålerenga. In July 2019, he moved to the Netherlands to play for SC Heerenveen, ignoring interest from clubs as Besiktas JK and Lazio Roma.

CSKA Moscow
On 28 August 2020, CSKA Moscow announced the signing of Ejuke from Heerenveen on a four-year contract.

On 30 September 2020, He scored the third goal in a 3–1 derby win over Spartak Moscow

Loan to Hertha BSC
On 3 July 2022, Ejuke suspended his contract with CSKA Moscow for the 2022–23 season, having taken advantage of the FIFA ruling relating to the Russian invasion of Ukraine. On 13 July 2022, Ejuke joined Hertha BSC in Germany for the 2022–23 season, He came on in the 56th minute of Hertha Berlins 3 -1 loss to Union Berlin for his debut on the 6 August 2022.

International career
Ejuke debuted for the Nigeria national team in a friendly 1–1 tie with Tunisia on 13 October 2020.

Career statistics

Honours
Individual
 Eredivisie Talent of the Month: September 2019

References

1998 births
Living people
Nigerian footballers
Nigeria international footballers
Nigeria under-20 international footballers
Nigeria youth international footballers
Nigerian expatriate footballers
Nigerian expatriate sportspeople in Norway
Nigerian expatriate sportspeople in the Netherlands
Nigerian expatriate sportspeople in Russia
Nigerian expatriate sportspeople in Germany
Expatriate footballers in Norway
Expatriate footballers in the Netherlands
Expatriate footballers in Russia
Expatriate footballers in Germany
Vålerenga Fotball players
SC Heerenveen players
PFC CSKA Moscow players
Hertha BSC players
Eliteserien players
Norwegian Second Division players
Eredivisie players
Russian Premier League players
Association football forwards
2021 Africa Cup of Nations players
People from Zaria